Angervilliers is a commune in the Essonne department in Île-de-France in northern France.

Inhabitants are known as Angervilliérois.

See also
Communes of the Essonne department

References

External links

Communes of Essonne